SM City Puerto Princesa is the 64th SM Supermall in the Philippines and the first one in the Mimaropa region. The mall is located at Malvar Street, Brgy, San Miguel, Puerto Princesa City, Palawan. It is owned and operated by SM Prime Holdings, and the mall has a gross floor area of 53,203 square meters.

Layout
SM City Puerto Princesa is the first prominent mall in the Philippines' largest province, Palawan, which is a major tourist destination. The mall is designed with landscaping in line with a resort-style concept. The mall is claimed to be a cost-efficient and energy saving building.

Features
The mall has a three levels of retail and dining spaces and anchors the SM Supermarket, the SM Store, Banco de Oro, Sports Central, Surplus, Cyberzone, Watsons, SM Appliance Center, and Ace Hardware. It features three screen digital cinema with a seating capacity of 474 (158 per screen), and two "Director's Club Cinemas" with 2 screens and a seating capacity of 96 (48 per screen).

References

SM Prime
Shopping malls in the Philippines
2017 establishments in the Philippines
Buildings and structures in Puerto Princesa